Maurice Cranston wrote a three-volume biography of the philosopher Jean-Jacques Rousseau, published between 1983 and 1998.

Bibliography 

 Jean-Jacques: The Early Life and Work of Jean-Jacques Rousseau, 1712–1754
 
 
 
 
 
 

The Noble Savage: Jean-Jacques Rousseau, 1754–1762
 
 
 
 
 Kelly 1992
 
 Kennedy 1994
 
 
 
 Rosenberg 1993
 

The Solitary Self: Jean-Jacques Rousseau in Exile and Adversity

External links 

 
 
 

Book series introduced in 1983
English-language books
Biographies about philosophers
Works about Jean-Jacques Rousseau